The National Prize of the German Democratic Republic (East Germany) was an award of the German Democratic Republic (GDR) given out in three different classes for scientific, artistic, and other meritorious achievement. With scientific achievements, it was often given to entire research groups rather than individual scientists.

History
The National Prize was awarded on 7 October, "Day of the Republic" every year since 1949.  It was given for "outstanding creative work in the fields of science and technology, important mathematical and scientific discoveries and technological inventions, the introduction of new working and production methods" and "outstanding works and achievements in the areas of art and literature." This coveted award could be given to East German citizens, groups, and even foreigners provided they made crucial contributions to socialist culture and science.

The National Prize was awarded in three classes, with corresponding monetary awards for each class. First class was 100,000 marks, second class was 50,000 marks and third class was 25,000 marks.

The medal is round, gold-plated, 26mm in diameter with a portrait of Goethe circled by the words "German Democratic Republic" on the obverse side. On the reverse are the words "National Award" circled by a pair of laurel wreaths. The ribbon bar consisted of the vertical bars consisting of the national colors of black, red and gold with a gold medal GDR state symbol attached to the center of the ribbon. The medal was worn on the upper right side of the chest.

Notable recipients
 1949: Heinrich Mann, Herbert Eulenberg, Fred Oelßner, Hermann Abendroth, Jürgen Kuczynski, Erich Engel, Friedrich Hund
 1950: Hans Boegehold, Hugo Schrade, August Klemm, Hans Marchwitza, Eduard Maurer, Johannes Stroux
 1951: Bertolt Brecht, Jurij Brězan, Cuno Hoffmeister, Anna Seghers, Andre Asriel, Erika Mann, Eduard Claudius
 1952: Walter Arnold, Max Burghardt, Aenne Goldschmidt
 1953: Eberhard Schmidt, Karl Max Schneider
 1954: Friedrich Behrens, Max Burghardt, Eduard Maurer, Ehm Welk
 1955: Ernst Bloch, Hans Marchwitza, Erwin Strittmatter, Ludwig Renn
 1956: Theodor Brugsch, Fidelio F. Finke, Paula Hertwig 
 1957: Erich Engel Franz Fühmann, Friedrich Jung
 1958: Bruno Apitz, Manfred von Ardenne
 1959: Stefan Heym, Alfred Lemmnitz, Erwin Kramer, Walter Arnold, Kurt Barthel, Gret Palucca, Ludwig Deiters, Werner Bergmann, Anna Seghers, Robert Havemann, Will Lammert, Friedrich Eisenkolb, Wilhelm Unverzagt
 1960: Karl Ewald Böhm, Werner Eggerath
 1961: Helmut Baierl, Erich Brehm, Inge Keller, Ludwig Renn
 1962: Edmund Collein
 1963: Bruno Apitz, Horst Drinda, Gisela May, Werner Neumann
 1964: Christa Wolf, Jurij Brězan, Harry Thürk, Hans Marchwitza
 1965: Manfred von Ardenne, Wolf Kaiser
 1966: Horst E. Brandt, Ernst Busch
 1967: Theo Balden, Lea Grundig, Wolf Kaiser
 1968: Lothar Bellag, Werner Bergmann, Wolf Kaiser, Manfred Krug, Konrad Wolf
 1969: Alfred Kurella, Horst E. Brandt, Theo Adam, Otto Braun
 1970: Helmut Baierl, Horst Drinda, Peter Edel, Johann Cilenšek
 1971: Horst E. Brandt, Werner Bergmann, Horst Drinda, Kurt Böwe, Günter Caspar, Manfred Krug, Anna Seghers
 1972: Curt Querner, Peter Schreier
 1973: Hannelore Bey, Max Butting, Hermann Kant, Gisela May, Herbert Sandberg
 1974: Peter Hacks, Hans Koch, Franz Fühmann, Jürgen Kuczynski, Frank Schöbel 
 1975: Frank Beyer, Jurek Becker
 1976: Theo Balden, Jurij Brězan, Angelica Domröse, Hans Pischner, Hans-Günther Thalheim
 1977: Peter Hacks, Inge Keller, Harry Thürk
 1978: Ludwig Güttler
 1979: Ernst Busch, Peter Damm
 1980: Heiner Carow
 1981: Gret Palucca
 1982: Puhdys, Kurt Masur
 1983: Hermann Kant
 1984: Karat (band), Reinhard Lakomy
 1985: Kurt Demmler, Ludwig Güttler
 1986: Heiner Müller 
 1987: Christa Wolf, Lothar Bellag, Ruth Berghaus
 1988: Category Science and Technology: Research collective in Dresden (For development on the Megabit-Chip); Volker Braun
 1989: Günter de Bruyn (turned down), Gerhard Schöne

References

Bibliography 

 
 
 Forschen und Wirken. Festschrift zur 150-Jahrfeier der Humboldt-Universität zu Berlin 1810-1960. Band 1, VEB Deutscher Verlag der Wissenschaften, Berlin 1960. S. XV Ehrentafel, Nationalpreisträger.

Orders, decorations, and medals of East Germany
Awards established in 1949
Awards disestablished in 1989
1949 establishments in East Germany
1989 disestablishments in East Germany